Bluestone Lake is a flood control reservoir located on the New River near Hinton, West Virginia. At its normal pool level, Bluestone Dam impounds a  stretch of the New and its tributary, the Bluestone River. At higher water levels, the lake extends into Giles County, Virginia.

Bluestone Dam

The lake is formed by Bluestone Dam, a concrete gravity dam located just upstream of the confluence of the New and Greenbrier Rivers. The dam was authorized by Presidential Executive Order in 1935 and approved by the U.S. Congress in the Flood Control Acts of 1936 and 1938. Construction of the project was begun in early 1941, suspended in 1944 because of World War II. Work resumed in 1946, and completed for operational purposes in 1949.

In recent years, it was discovered that Bluestone Dam would be unable to pass the Probable Maximum Flood possible at the site, which could cause failure of the dam. To remedy the problem, the U.S. Army Corps of Engineers has undertaken a Dam Safety Assurance program for Bluestone. The first phase of the project was completed in October 2004. The second phase, installing bedrock anchors, was completed in 2011. Three additional phases remain to be constructed.

Recreation
Due to its large size, Bluestone Lake provides many recreational opportunities including boating and fishing. The West Virginia Division of Natural Resources operates Bluestone State Park and Bluestone Wildlife Management Area, each encompassing portions of the lake. Camping and other activities are available in these facilities.

See also
Bluestone State Park
Bluestone Wildlife Management Area
New River

References

External links
US Army Corps of Engineers: Bluestone Lake

Protected areas of Giles County, Virginia
Reservoirs in Virginia
Reservoirs in West Virginia
Protected areas of Mercer County, West Virginia
Protected areas of Monroe County, West Virginia
Protected areas of Summers County, West Virginia
United States Army Corps of Engineers, Huntington District
Dams in West Virginia
United States Army Corps of Engineers dams
Dams completed in 1949
Bodies of water of Giles County, Virginia
Bodies of water of Mercer County, West Virginia
Bodies of water of Monroe County, West Virginia
Bodies of water of Summers County, West Virginia